Brodersby-Goltoft is a municipality in the district of Schleswig-Flensburg, in Schleswig-Holstein, Germany. In March 2018 the former municipality of Goltoft was merged into Brodersby, and the municipality was renamed into Brodersby-Goltoft.

References

Municipalities in Schleswig-Holstein
Schleswig-Flensburg